This is a sublist of the List of marine fishes of South Africa for bony fishes recorded from the oceans bordering South Africa.
This list comprises locally used common names, scientific names with author citation and recorded ranges. Ranges specified may not be the entire known range for the species, but should include the known range within the waters surrounding the Republic of South Africa.

List ordering and taxonomy complies where possible with the current usage in Wikispecies, and may differ from the cited source, as listed citations are primarily for range or existence of records for the region.
Sub-taxa within any given taxon are arranged alphabetically as a general rule.
Details of each species may be available through the relevant internal links. Synonyms may be listed where useful.

Superclass Osteichthyes – Bony fishes 
All entries in this list are included in this superclass. There are two classes represented: Actinopterygii and Sarcopterygii.

Class Actinopterygii – Ray-finned fishes

Subclass Neopterygii 
Only one Infraclass - Teleostei - is represented.

Superorder Acanthopterygii – Spiny finned fishes

Superorder Clupeomorpha

Order Clupeiformes
Family: Chirocentridae – Wolfherrings
Wolfherring Chirocentrus dorab (Forsskål, 1775) (Durban to Mozambique)

Family: Clupeidae – Herrings, sardines and pilchards
East coast roundherring Etrumeus teres (De Kay, 1842) (Durban to Mozambique border)
Roundherring Etrumeus whiteheadi Wongratana, 1983 (Walvis Bay to KwaZulu-Natal)
Estuarine roundherring Gilchristella aestuaria (Gilchrist, 1913) (Knysna to Kosi bay, Saldanha Bay and possibly north to Orange River mouth)
Blueline herring Herklotsichthys quadrimaculatus (Rüppell, 1837) (Algoa Bay to Indo-Pacific)
Razorbelly or Kelee shadHilsa kelee (Cuvier, 1829) (Transkei to Mozambique and Indo-Pacific)
Gizzard shad Nematalosa nasus (Bloch, 1795) (off Durban Bay; Gulf of Aden to Hong Kong)
Indian pellona Pellona ditchela Valenciennes 1847 (Durban to Indo-Pacific)
White sardinelle Sardinella albella (Valenciennes 1847) (Durban to Indo-Pacific, possibly East London)
Round sardinelle Sardinella aurita Valenciennes, 1847 (Walvis Bay to Saldanha Bay)
Goldstripe sardinelle Sardinella gibbosa (Bleeker, 1849) (Port Alfred to Mozambique)
Pilchard or Sardine Sardinops sagax (Jenyns, 1842) (Namibia to Mozambique)
Delicate roundherring Spratelloides delicatulus (Bennett, 1831) (Zululand to Indo-Pacific)

Family: Engraulidae – Anchovies
Cape anchovy Engraulus japonicus Temminck & Schlegel, 1846 (Walvis Bay to Mozambique and Indo-Pacific)
Thorny anchovy Stolephorus holodon (Boulenger, 1900) (Swartkops estuary to northern Mozambique)
Indian anchovy Stolephorus indicus (van Hasselt, 1823) (Natal to Indo-Pacific)
Buccaneer anchovy Stolephorus punctifer (Fowler, 1938) (St Lucia, possibly Durban, to Indo-Pacific to Hawaii)
Longjaw glassnose Thryssa setirostris (Broussonet, 1782) (Transkei through Indian Ocean to Indonesia and China)
Orangemouth glassnose or Bony Thryssa vitrirostris (Gilchrist & Thompson, 1908) (Port Elizabeth to Mozambique)
Thryssa setirostris (Broussonet, 1782)

Superorder Cyclosquamata

Order Aulopiformes
Suborder:  Alepisauroidei

Family: Alepisauridae – Lancetfishes
Omosudis lowei Günther, 1887 (1 specimen from not far off east coast at about 25°S; otherwise known from all oceans between 40°S and 40°N)
Shortsnout lancetfish Alepisaurus brevirostris Gibbs, 1960 (one specimen from off Algoa Bay; in all major oceans)
Longsnout lancetfish Alepisaurus ferox Lowe, 1833 (Walvis Bay to Sodwana Bay; in all major oceans)

Family: Evermannellidae – Sabretooth fishes
Coccorella atlantica (Parr, 1928) (central water areas of all 3 major oceans; off western and south-western Cape coast, 1 specimen from 31°34'S, 30°09'E)
Evermanella balbo (Risso, 1820) (4 specimens from off southern Natal, presumed to be circumglobal in transition region of southern oceans)

Family: Paralepididae – Barracudinas (incl. Anotopteridae — Daggertooths)
Anopterus pharao Zugmeyer, 1911 (off west coast; south of Cape Agulhas; off Transkei and in Mozambique channel; worldwide between 25°N and 65°S)
Lestidiops jayakari (Boulenger, 1889) (worldwide in tropical to temperate waters)
Lestidiops similis (Ege, 1933) (Tropical and temperate Atlantic between 45°N and 45°S)
Lestidium Atlanticum (Borodin, 1928) (Tropical to subtropical all oceans)
Lestrolepis intermedia (Poey, 1868) (Tropical in all oceans; off South Africa only in Agulhas current)
Macroparalepis affinis Ege, 1933 (anti-tropical in Atlantic Ocean)
Macroparalepis macrogeneion Post, 1973 (South Atlantic sub-tropical convergence area from South Africa to continental slope off South America)
Magnisudis prionosa (Rofen, 1963) (Circumglobal in southern oceans from 20°S to Antarctic)
Notolepis rissoi (Bonaparte, 1840) (worldwide in temperate and tropical waters)
Paralepis elongata (Brauer, 1906) (One specimen from Natal, now missing)
Stemonosudis elegans (Ege, 1933) (tropical Indo-Pacific, off South Africa only in Agulhas current)
Stemonosudis gracilis (Ege, 1933) (Tropical waters of Indian and Pacific oceans; Off South Africa only in Agulhas current)
Sudis hyalina Rafinesque, 1810 (Atlantic Ocean from 50°N to South Africa)

Family: Scopelarchidae — Pearleyes
Benthalbella infans Zugmayer, 1911 (off south-western Cape; tropical/subtropical in all 3 major oceans)
Benthalbella macropinna Bussing and Bussing, 1966 (off south-western Cape coast; circumpolar in subantarctic and Antarctic waters)
Scopelarchus analis (Brauer, 1902) (Common off southern Africa; tropical/subtropical all oceans)
Scopelarchus guentheri Alcock, 1896 (off Durban; mainly tropical in the Atlantic, tropical/subtropical in Indian and Pacific oceans)
Scopelarchus michaelsarsi Koefoed, 1955 (South-east of Durban;tropical/subtropical in all oceans)

Suborder: Chlorophthalmoidei

Family: Bathysauropsidae
Bathysauropsis gracilis (Günther, 1878) (off Cape Point; circumglobal in southern oceans)

Family: Chlorophthalmidae — Greeneyes
Chlorophthalmus punctatus Gilchrist, 1904 (both coasts of South Africa) (possibly a synonym of C.agassizii Bonaparte, 1840)

Family: Ipnopidae
Bathymicrops regis Hjort and Koefoed, 1912 (once off Port Elizabeth in Agulhas basin)
Bathypterois filiferus Gilchrist, 1906 (off Cape Point)
Bathypterois guentheri Alcock, 1889 (off east coast between 22° - 33°S)
Bathypterois phenax Parr, 1928 (off Cape Point)
Bathytyphlops marionae Mead, 1959 (off Beira, Durban and Agulhas bank)
Ipnops agassizii Garman, 1899 (off Cape Point)

Family: Notosudidae — Notosudids
Scopelosaurus ahlstromi Bertelsen, Krefft and Marshall, 1976 (all 3 oceans from about 32° to 45°S)
Scopelosaurus hamiltoni (Waite, 1916) (Southern oceans from about 30° to 60°S)
Scopelosaurus herwigi Bertelson, Krefft and Marshall, 1976 (slope areas of Southern Africa)
Scopelosaurus meadi Bertelson, Krefft and Marshall, 1976 (from about 19° to 43°S)
Scopelosaurus smithii Bean, 1925 (mainly tropical, larger juveniles and adults also subtropical in all 3 oceans)

Suborder: Giganturoidei
 
Family: Bathysauridae
Bathysaurus ferox Günther, 1878 (off Cape Province; Both sides of Atlantic; off New Zealand)

Family: Giganturidae — Telescopefish
Rosaura indica (Brauer, 1901) (Tropical/subtropical in all 3 major oceans; Indian Ocean from 35°49'S, 23°09'E northwards)

Suborder: Synodontoidei

Family: Synodontidae — Lizardfishes
Blotchy lizardfish Saurida gracilis (Quoy and Gaimard, 1824) (Indo-West Pacific to Algoa Bay)
Largescale lizardfish Saurida undosquamis (Richardson, 1848) (Indo-West Pacific to Knysna)
Spotnose lizardfish Synodus binotatus Schultz, 1953 (Indo-West Pacific, south to Natal)
Variegated lizardfish Synodus dermatogenys Fowler, 1912 (Indo-West Pacific south to Algoa Bay)
Indian lizardfish Synodus indicus (Day, 1873) (Mossel Bay to Red Sea and Sri Lanka)
Blacktail lizardfish Synodis jaculum Russell and Cressey, 1979 (Indo-West Pacific south to Natal)
Redband lizardfish Synodus variegatus (Lacepède, 1803) (Central KwaZulu-Natal to Red Sea)
Painted lizardfish Trachinocephalus myops (Forster, 1801) (Tropical and warm temperate waters of all oceans, east coast south to Knysna)

Superorder Elopomorpha

Order Albuliformes — Bonefishes
Family: Albulidae 
Bonefish Albula vulpes (Linnaeus, 1758) (Algoa Bay to tropics)

Order Anguilliformes — Eels
Suborder: Anguilloidei

Family: Anguillidae — Freshwater eels
African mottled eel Anguilla bengalensis labiata (Peters, 1852) (Knysna to Kenya)
Shortfin eel Anguilla bicolor bicolor McClelland, 1844 (Knysna to Kenya)
Madagascar mottled eel Anguilla marmorata Qoy and Gaimard, 1824 (Western Cape to Kenya)
Longfin eel Anguilla mossambica (Peters, 1852) (Most waters of the Cape northwards)

Family: Moringuidae — Spaghetti eels
Spaghetti eel Moringua microchir (Bleeker, 1853) (Natal to Indo-West Pacific)
Family: Chlopsidae — False morays
Plain false moray Kaupichthys hyoproroides (Strömman, 1896) (Natal)
Family: Muraenidae — Moray eels
Anarchias seychellensis Smith, 1962 (Sodwana Bay)
Whiteface moray Echidna leucotaenia Schultz, 1943 (Natal northwards and east to central Pacific)
Floral moray Echidna nebulosa (Ahl, 1789) (Port Alfred to Mozambique)
Barred moray Echidna polyzona (Richardson, 1945) (Natal northwards, Indo-Pacific)
Blackcheek moray Gymnothorax breedeni McCosker and Randall, 1977 (Sodwana Bay))
Lattice-tail moray Gymnothorax buroensis (Bleeker, 1857) (Natal northwards, Indo-Pacific))
Tiger moray Gymnothorax enigmatus McCosker and Randall, 1882 (Natal, Indo-Pacific))
Salt and pepper moray Gymnothorax eurostus (Abbott, 1861) (Transkei to Bazaruto))
Honeycomb moray Gymnothorax favagineus Bloch & Schneider, 1801 (Port Elizabeth to Mozambique))
Yellow-edged moray Gymnothorax flavimarginatus (Rüppell, 1830) (Transkei northwards, Indo-Pacific)
Freckled moray Gymnothorax fuscomaculatus (Schultz, 1953) (Natal; Central Pacific)
Geometric moray Gymnothorax griseus (Lacepède, 1803) (transkei to Red Sea)(syn. Sideria grisea)
Whitespotted moray Gymnothorax johnsoni (Smith, 1962) (Algoa Bay to Sodwana Bay)
Trunk-eyed moray Gymnothorax margaritophorus (Bleeker, 1865) (Transkei to Bazaruto, Indo-Pacific)
Blackspot moray Gymnothorax melatremus (Schultz, 1953) (Sodwana Bay)
Guineafowl moray Gymnothorax meleagris (Shaw and Nodder, 1795) (Algoa Bay to southern Mozambique; Indo-Pacific)
Starry moray Gymnothorax nudivomer (Günther, 1867)(Transkei to Zanzibar)
Reticulated moray Gymnothorax permistus (Smith, 1962) (Transkei to Delagoa Bay)
Paintspotted moray Gymnothorax pictus (Ahl, 1789) (Natal to Indo-Pacific)(syn. Siderea picta)
Leopard moray Gymnothorax undulatus (Lacepède, 1803) (Port Alfred to southern Mozambique; Indo-Pacific)
Bar-tail moray Gymnothorax zonipectis Seale, 1906 (Sodwana Bay, central Pacific)
Zebra moray Gymnomuraena zebra (Shaw, 1797) (Transkei to Mozambique))(syn. Echidna zebra)
Tiger reef-eel Scuticaria tigrina (Lesson, 1828) (Natal to Southern Mozambique; Indo-Pacific)(syn. Uropterygius tigrinus(Lesson, 1829))
Slender giant moray Strophidon sathete (Hamilton, 1822) (Bashee River to tropical Indo-Pacific)(syn. Thyrsoidea macrura (Bleeker, 1854))
Uniform reef-eel Uropterygius concolor Rüppell, 1838 (Durban to Red Sea)
Barlip reef eel Uropterygius kamar McCosker and Randall, 1977 (Sodwana Bay; Indo-Pacific)
Shortfinned reef eel Uropterygius micropterus (Bleeker, 1852) (Durban northwards; Indo-Pacific)
Freckleface reef eel Uropterygius xanthopterus Bleeker, 1859 (Sodwana Bay to southern Mozambique: Indo-Pacific)

Suborder: Congroidei

Family: Congridae — Conger eels
Blunt-tooth conger Ariosoma mauritianum (Pappenheim, 1914) (Natal to Indo-West Pacific)
Tropical conger Ariosoma scheelei (Stromman, 1896) (Natal to Mozambique and Indo-Pacific)
Hairy conger Bassanago albescens (Barnard, 1923) (Cape Point)
Bathyuroconger vicinus (Vaillant, 1888) (off Cape Point)
Coloconger scholesi Chan, 1967 (Natal to southern Mozambique)
Blackedged conger Conger cinereus Rüppell, 1830 (Mossel Bay to Mozambique)
Cape conger Conger wilsoni (Bloch and Schneider 1801) (Cape to southern Mozambique)
Southern conger Gnathophis capensis (Kaup, 1856) (False Bay to Plettenberg Bay)
Strap conger Gnathophis habenatus (Richardson, 1848) (Southern Cape to East London)
Rhechias wallacei (Castle, 1968) (Natal to southern Mozambique)
Longtail conger Uroconger lepturus (Richardson, 1854) (Natal to Red Sea and Indo-Pacific)

Family: Derichthyidae — Longneck eels
Derichthys serpentinus Gill, 1884 (west of Cape Town; worldwide)
Nessorhamphus ingolfianus (Schmidt, 1912) (off the Cape, also worldwide)

Family: Muraenesocidae — Pike congers
Pike conger Muraenesox bagio (Hamilton-Buchanan, 1822) (Knysna to Indo-Pacific)

Family: Nettastomatidae — Witch eels
Venefica proboscidea (Vaillant, 1888) (off the Cape)

Family: Ophichthidae — Snake-eels and worm-eels
Snake eel Apterichtus klazingai (Weber. 1913) (off Durban; Indonesia and western Pacific)
Longtailed sand-eel Bascanichthys kirkii (Günther, 1870) (Natal to Aden)
Crocodile snake-eel Brachysomophis crocodilinus (Bennett, 1833) (Natal, Tanzania, Seychelles, Mauritius and Indo-Pacific)
Marbled snake-eel Callechelys marmorata (Bleeker, 1853) (Natal to central Indo-Pacific)
Fringelip snake-eel Cirrhimuraena playfairii (Günther, 1870) (Kosi Bay to Zanzibar)
Sharpnose sand-eel Ichthyapus acuticeps (Barnard, 1923) (Durban to Zululand)
Finny sand-eel Lamnostoma orientalis (McClelland, 1844) (Natal)
Halfbanded snake-eel Leiuranus semicinctus (Lay and Bennett, 1839) (Knysna to Indo-Pacific)
Ocellated snake-eel Myrichthys maculosus (Cuvier, 1816) (Port Alfred to Kenya, Indo-Pacific and eastern PacificM)
Bluntnose snake-eel Ophichthus apicalis (Bennett, 1830) (St Francis Bay to Kenya, Madagascar and Indo-Pacific)
Slender snake-eel Ophichthus bennettai McCosker, 1986 (Cape Province west coast)
Saddled snake-eel Ophichthus erabo (Jordan and Snyder, 1901) (off Durban; Indo-Pacific to Hawaii)
Shorthead snake-eel Ophichthus marginatus (Peters, 1855) (Knysna; Aldabra to Inhaca)
Plain snake-eel Ophichthus unicolor Regan, 1908 (Algoa Bay)
Sand snake-eel Ophisurus serpens (Linnaeus 1766) (Angola to southern Mozambique)
Estuary snake-eel Pisodonophis boro (Hamilton-Buchanan, 1822) (Knysna to Indo-Pacific)
Longfin snake-eel Pisodonophis cancrivorus (Richardson, 1844) (Algoa Bay to Indo-Pacific)
Slender worm-eel Scolecenchelys gymnota (Bleeker, 1857) (Bredasdorp to Zululand, east Africa to central Pacific)(syn. Muraenichthys gymnotus Bleeker, 1864)
Redfin worm-eel Scolecenchelys laticaudata (Ogilby, 1897) (East London to Indo-Pacific)(syn. Muraenichthys laticaudata (Ogilby, 1897)
Orangehead worm-eel Scolecenchelys xorae (Smith, 1958) (Algoa Bay to Natal)(syn. Muraenichthys xorae Smith, 1958)
Earthworm snake-eel Yirrkala lumbricoides (Bleeker 1853) (off Durban; Northern Australia and Indo Pacific)
Thin sand-eel Yirrkala tenuis (Günther, 1870)(Natal to southern Mozambique, Red Sea and possibly Mauritius)

Suborder: Nemichthyoidei

Family: Nemichthyidae — Snipe eels
Avocettina acuticeps (Regan, 1916) (offshore Cape to Natal)
Avocettina paucipora Nielsen and Smith, 1978 (off Durban)
Nemichthys curvirostris (Strömman, 1896) (off the Cape)
Nemichthys scolopaceus (Richardson, 1848) (off the Cape to Natal)

Family: Serrivomeridae — Sawtooth eels
Serrivomer beanii Gill and Ryder, 1883 (off Cape and Natal)

Suborder: Synaphobranchoidei

Family: Synaphobranchidae — Cutthroat eels
Diastobranchus capensis Barnard, 1923 (off Cape Point)
Arrowtooth eel Dysomma anguillare Barnard, 1923 (Off Tugela river, Natal)
Histiobranchus bathybius (Günther, 1877) (off Durban)
Ilyophis brunneus Gilbert, 1892 (Off the Cape)
Simenchelys parasitica Gill, 1879 (off the Cape)
Synaphobranchus affinis Günther, 1877 (off Durban)
Synaphobranchus kaupii Johnson, 1862 (off the Cape)

Order Elopiformes
Family: Elopidae — Ladyfishes
Atlantic ladyfish Elops lacerta Valenciennes, 1846 (Atlantic coast to 23°S)
Ladyfish or Springer Elops machnata (Forsskål, 1775) (Mossel Bay to Mozambique)
Family: Megalopidae — Tarpons
Oxeye tarpon Megalops cyprinoides (Broussonet, 1782) (Port Alfred to Mozambique)

Order Notacanthiformes
Family: Halosauridae — Halosaurs
Aldrovandia affinis (Günther, 1877) (Both coasts of SA; cicumglobal tropical and temperate)
Aldrovandia phalacra (Vaillant, 1888) (off Cape Point)
Halosauropsis macrochir (Günther, 1878) (off Cape Point)
Halosaurus ovenii Johnson, 1863 (off Cape Point to Walvis Bay)

Family: Notacanthidae — Spiny eels
Notacanthus sexspinis Richardson, 1846 (Walvis Bay to Durban)
Polyacanthonotus africanus (Gilchrist and von Bonde, 1924) (off Cape Point)
Polyacanthonotus rissoanus (De Filippi & Verany, 1857) (off Cape Point to Table Bay)

Order Saccopharyngiformes
Familia: Cyematidae — Arrow eels
Cyema atrum Günther, 1878 (Off southwest coast)
Neocyema erythrosoma Castle, 1978 (west of Cape Town)

Superorder Lampridiomorpha

Order Lampridiformes
Family: Lamprididae — Opahs (Lampridae in Smiths)
Spotted opah Lampris guttatus (Brünnich, 1788) (all oceans but not in polar waters, occurs throughout Soath African waters, usually well offshore)
Southern opah Lampris immaculatus Gilchrist, 1904 (Circumglobal south of 30°S)

Family: Lophotidae — Crestfishes
Unicorn crestfish Eumecichthys fiski (Günther, 1890) (1 specimen, Kalk Bay in False Bay)
Crestfish Lophotus lacepede Giorna, 1809 (Cape to Plettenberg Bay, rare but widely distributed in all oceans)

Family: Radiicephalidae — Tapertail
Tapertail Radiicephalus elongatus Osorio, 1917 (70 miles SW of Cape Point)

Family: Regalecidae — Oarfishes
Streamer fish Agrostichthys parkeri Giorna, 1809 (Southeast Atlantic, New Zealand and Tasmania)
Oarfish Regalescus glesne Ascanius, 1772 (worldwide distribution)

Family: Stylephoridae — Tube-eye
Stylephorus chordatus Shaw, 1791 (Three specimens taken off the east coast between 31°51'S - 33°10'S, 28°17'E - 30°01'E)

Family: Trachipteridae — Ribbonfishes
Polka-dot ribbonfish Desmodema polysticum (Ogilby, 1897) (1 juvenile washed ashore at Xora river and 1 found at Simon's Town, False Bay)
Blacktail ribbonfish Trachipterus jacksonensis (Ramsay, 1881) (East London and off Cape Town)
Peregrine ribbonfish Trachipterus trachypterus (Gmelin, 1789) (off Table Bay)
Scalloped ribbonfish Zu cristatus (prejuveniles collected at Luderitz, Algoa bay and Durban)
Taper tail ribbonfish Zu elongatus (Heemstra and Kannemeyer, 1984) (4 specimens trawled off the western Cape coast)

Superorder Ostariophysi

Order Gonorynchiformes
Family: Chanidae
Milkfish Chanos chanos (Forsskål, 1775) (Krom river to tropical Indo-West Pacific)

Family: Gonorynchidae — Beaked sandfish
Beaked sandfish Gonorynchus gonorynchus (Linnaeus 1766) (Cape of Good Hope)

Order Siluriformes — Catfishes

Family: Ariidae – Sea catfishes
Black seacatfish Galeichthys ater Castelnau, 1861 (South coast to Port Alfred)
White seacatfish Galeichthys feliceps Valenciennes, 1840 (Walvis Bay to Natal)
Natal Seacatfish Galeichthys sp. (Transkei to Mozambique)

Family: Plotosidae — Eel catfishes
Striped eel-catfish Plotosus lineatus (Thunberg, 1787) (Port Elizabeth to Mozambique)
Eel-catfish Plotosus nkunga Gomon & Taylor, 1982 (Knysna to Kosi Bay)

Superorder Paracanthopterygii

Order Batrachoidiformes

Family: Batrachoididae — Toadfishes
Puzzled toadfish Austrobatrachus foedus (Smith, 1947) (Algoa Bay to Coffee Bay, Transkei)
White-ribbed toadfish Batrichthys albofasciatus Smith, 1934 (1 specimen, Great Fish Point)
Snakehead toadfish Batrichthys apiatus (Valenciennes, 1837) (Saldanha Bay to Umtata River, Transkei)
Pleated toadfish Batrichthys felinus Smith, 1952 (Cape to Port Alfred)
Chocolate toadfish Chatrabus hendersoni Smith, 1952 (Port Alfred to Storms River Mouth)
Broadbodied toadfish Riekertia ellisi Smith, 1952 (Durban to Port St. Johns)

Order Gadiformes

Family: Bregmacerotidae — Codlets
Bregmaceros atlanticus Goode and Bean, 1886 (Off south Cape and Natal coasts; Circumtropical)
Bregmaceros macclellandii Thompson, 1840 (from Cape eastwards; circumtropical but not known from east Pacific)
Bregmaceros nectabanus Whitley, 1941 (Cape eastwards to tropical Indo-West Pacific; Tropical eastern Atlantic)

Family: Gadidae — Cods
Cape rockling Gaidropserus capensis (Kaup, 1858) (Cape Town to East London)
Comb rockling Gaidropseris insularum Sivertsen, 1945 (Cape Peninsula and West coast)

Family: Macrouridae — Grenadiers
Bathygadus favosus  Goode and Bean, 1886 (off Cape Town)
Bathygadus melanobranchus Vaillant, 1888 (Table Bay and Natal coast. Unverified, specimens missing)
Bathygadus sp. (cf. favosus Goode and Bean) (Mozambique and Agulhas Bank)
Coelorhynchus acanthiger Barnard, 1925 (off Namibia to Cape Point)
Coelorhynchus braueri Barnard, 1925 (Saldanha and Table Bay, Cape Point, East London; Angola to Mozambique)
Coelorhynchus denticulatus Regan, 1921 (Natal coast to Tanzania)
Coelorhynchus fasciatus (Günther, 1878) (off south coast)
Coelorhynchus flabellispinus (Alcock, 1894) (Indian Ocean. specimens from southern Africa differ somewhat from those off India an may be a different species)
Coelorinchus matamua (McCann & McKnight, 1980) (apparently abundant off South Africa, also found off New Zealand and southern Australia) (syn. Mahia matamua McCann and McKnight, 1980)
Coryphaenoides armatus (Hector, 1875) (abyssal, all oceans except Arctic. One Atlantic record off South Africa)
Coryphaenoides striatura Barnard, 1925 (off Cape Point)
Coryphaenoides subserrulatus Makushok, 1976 (Agulhas bank)
Gadomus capensis (Gilchrist and von Bonde, 1924) (Table Bay to Mozambique)
Macrourus holotrachys Günther, 1878 (Cape Point and Prince Edward Island; also off New Zealand and southwestern Australia)
Malacocephalus laevis (Lowe, 1843) (off South Africa; widespread in Atlantic and Indian oceans)
Mesobius antipodum Hubbs and Iwamoto, 1977 (off south coast of SA; New Zealand, eastern Indian Ocean and Madagascar plateau)
Nezumia brevibarbata (Barnard, 1925) (Cape Point; Known only off the Cape, where it is common)
Nezumia leonis(Barnard, 1925) (off Cape Point); Namibia; southwestern Atlantic)
Trachyrincus scabrus (Rafinesque, 1810) (Namibia, west coast of South Africa; eastern North Atlantic and Mediterranean sea)
Ventrifossa aff. divergens Gilbert and Hubbs, 1920 (off East London, Durban, Natal and southern Mozambique)
Ventrifossa nasuta (Smith, 1935) (Durban to Mozambique)
Ventrifossa ori (Smith, 1968) (off Agulhas bank, Durban and East London)

Family: Melanonidae — Melanonids
Melanonus gracilis Günther, 1878 (Circum-Antarctic south of Subtropical convergence; off Cape Peninsula)

Family: Merlucciidae — Hakes
Lyconodes argenteus (Gilchrist, 1922) (west of Cape of Good Hope)
Straptail Macruronis capensis Davies, 1950 (off Algoa Bay)
Shallow water hake Merluccius capensis Castelnau, 1861 (Namibia to East London)
Deep water hake Merluccius paradoxus Franca, 1960 (Cape Frio to East London)

Family: Moridae — Deepsea cods
Antimora rostrata (Günther, 1878) (Locally abundant, found in most oceans)
Laemonema compressicauda (Gilchrist, 1904) (2 small specimens off Transkei)
Laemonema globiceps Gilchrist, 1906 (off south-western Cape coast)
Lepidion capensis Gilchrist, 1922 (Cape to East London)
Lepidion natalensis Gilchrist, 1922 (continental slope off Natal)
Physiculus capensis Gilchrist, 1922 (Cape Peninsula to East London)
Physiculus natalensis Gilchrist, 1922 (upper slope off Natal)
Tripterophycis gilchristi Boulenger, 1902 (upper slope off the Cape and Durban)

Order Lophiiformes — Anglerfishes

Suborder: Antennarioidei

Family: Antennariidae — Anglers
Freckled angler Antennarius coccineus (Lesson, 1831) (Natal; throughout Indian Ocean, Red Sea and tropical Pacific to Hawaiian islands; Tropical and eastern Pacific off Costa Rica and Cocos and Galapagos islands)
Big angler Antennarius commersoni (Latreille, 1804) (Natal, Red Sea and tropical Indo-West Pacific to Hawaiian islands)
Shaggy angler Antennarius hispidus (Bloch and Schneider, 1801) (Indo-West Pacific, south to Knysna)
Painted angler Antennarius pictus (Shaw and Nodder, 1794) (Durban to Zanzibar and tropical Indo-West Pacific to Hawaii)
Striped angler Antennarius striatus (Shaw and Nodder, 1794) (Algoa Bay through Indo-West Pacific to Hawaiian islands)
Pygmy angler Antennarius tuberosus (Cuvier, 1817) (Natal, Maputo, Madagascar, Aldabra islands, and throughout Indo-West Pacific including Hawaiian and Line islands, and Taumotu Archipelago to Pitcairn island)
Sargassum fish Histrio histrio (Linnaeus, 1758) (Cape Point to Mozambique)

Suborder: Lophioidei

Family: Lophiidae — Monks
Natal monk Lophiodes insidiator (Regan, 1921) (Natal to northern Madagascar)
Lophiodes mutilus (Alcock, 1893) (Indo-West Pacific south to Natal)
Lophiomus setigerus (Vahl, 1797) (Indo-West Pacific south to False Bay)
Monk Lophius upsicephalus Smith, 1841 (off Cape of Good Hope; Eastern South Atlantic and South western Indian Ocean off South Africa)
Lophius vomerinus (Valenciennes, 1837) (off Cape of Good Hope; Bay of Bengal off Burma)

Suborder: Ogcocephalioidei

Superfamily: Ceratioidea

Family: Ceratiidae — Seadevils
Ceratias holboelli Krøyer, 1845 (single specimen off Cape Town at 34°12'S, 16°35'E; Nearly cosmopolitan in the world's oceans)
Ceratias tentaculatus (Norman, 1930) (Specimens from off Dealagoa bay, off southern Natal, off Saldanha bay. Throughout southern oceans)
Cryptopsaras couesii Gill, 1883 (off Cape of Good Hope, all major oceans)

Family: Himantolophidae — Footballfish
Himantolophus groenlandicus Reinhardt, 1837 (all major oceans)

Family: Linophrynidae — Dwarf anglers
Linophryne parini Bertelsen, 1980 (1 specimen off Port Alfred)
Linophryne digitopogon Balushkin and Trunov, 1988 (1 specimen off Hondeklipbaai on west coast)

Family: Melanocetidae — Devil-anglers
Melanocetus johnsonii Günther, 1864 (off all coasts of South Africa; all major oceans)

Superfamily: Chaunacioidea

Family: Chaunacidae — Coffinfishes
Chaunax pencillatus McCulloch, 1915 (Natal and Southern Mozambique)
Chaunax pictus Lowe, 1846 (Knysna to Natal)

Superfamily: Ogcocephalioidea

Family: Ogcocephalidae — Seabats
Dibranchus stellulatus Gilbert, 1905 (Off Natal; Hawaii)
Circular seabatHalieutaea fitzsimonsi (Gilchrist and Thompson, 1916) (Plettenberg bay to Tugela river, Natal)
Hairy seabat Halieutaea hancocki Regan, 1908 (Tropical Indian Ocean; off Natal)
Spiny seabat Halieutaea spicata Smith, 1965 (1 specimen, Isipingo, Natal)
Halieutopsis micropus (Alcock, 1891) (off Durban; South Africa to Philippines)
Longnose seabat Malthopsis luteus Alcock, 1891 (off Knysna; Eastern Indian Ocean and Japan)
Malthopsis mitrigera Gilbert and Cramer, 1897 (Natal to the Philippines, Japan and Hawaii)
Spearnose seabat Malthopsis tiarella Jordan, 1902 (Natal and Japan)

Order Ophidiiformes

Family: Aphyonidae — Aphyonids
Aphyonus brevidorsalis Nielsen, 1969 (1 specimen 34°09'S, 30°45'E)
Aphyonus gelatinosus Günther, 1878 (1 specimen off Natal, all oceans)
?Barathronus bicolor Goode and Bean, 1886 (off Cape Point, specimen lost, identification dubious)
Barathronus maculatus Shcherbachev, 1976 (off Durban, northern Madagascar and Japan)

Family: Bythitidae — Bythitids or Brotulas
Freetail brotula Bidenichthys capensis Barnard, 1934 ((East London to the Cape)
Cataetyx chthamalorhynchus Cohen, 1981 (1 specimen off Saldanha Bay)
Cataetyx niki Cohen, 1981 (2 specimens from off the Cape)
Orange brotula Dermatopsoides kasougae (Smith, 1943) (Algoa bay to Port Alfred)
Lesser orange brotula Dermatopsoides talboti Cohen, 1966 (Saldanha Bay to Algoa Bay)
Diplacanthopoma nigripinnis Gilchrist and von Bonde, 1924 (Off Natal)
Bighead brotula Grammonus opisthodon (Smith, 1934) (Port Alfred and off Storms River Mouth)

Family: Carapidae — Pearlfishes
Star pearlfish Carapus mourlani (Petit, 1934) (Indo-West Pacific south to Natal)
Giant pearlfish Encheliophis boraborensis (Kaup 1856) (Indo-West Pacific to Natal)
Speckled pearlfish Encheliophis gracilis (Bleeker, 1856) (Indo-West Pacific to Natal)
Eel pearlfish Eurypleuron owasianum (Matsubara, 1953) (Japan, Papua New Guinea, Australia, New Zealand, southeastern Pacific, Mozambique and South Africa)
Pearlfish Onuxodon fowleri (Smith, 1955) (Indo-West Pacific from Durban to Hawaii)
Oyster pearlfish Onuxodon parvibrachium (Fowler, 1927) (Indo-West Pacific south to Durban)
Dogtooth pearlfish Pyramodon punctatus (Regan, 1914)  (New Zealand, Australia and South Africa (one adult from off East London))

Family: Ophidiidae — Cuskeels
Bassogigas? gillii Goode and Bean, 1896 (1 specimen off Agulhas Bank)
Bassozetus robustus Smith and Radcliffe, 1913 (One specimen off Natal)
Brotula multibarbata Temminck and Schlegel, 1846 (Red Sea to Port Alfred and east to central Pacific)
Brotulataenia crassa Parr, 1934 (Tropical Atlantic off South Africa and southwest Indian Ocean)
Dicrolene multifilis (Alcock, 1889) (Off Table Bay and east coast of South Africa)
Epetriodus freddyi Cohen and Nielsen, 1978 (between about 18° and 35°S in western Indian Ocean)
Kingklip Genypterus capensis (Smith, 1847) (Walvis Bay to Algoa Bay)
Holcomycteronus aequatorius (Smith and Radcliffe, 1913) (3 specimens from off east coast)
False Kingklip Hoplobrotula gnathopus Regan, 1921 (Natal)
Lamprogrammus niger Alcock, 1891 (off Natal, probably circumtropical)
Luciobrotula bartschi (Smith and Radcliffe, 1913) (one specimen trawled off Natal; known from Hawaii, Philippines and western Indian Ocean))
Monomitopus nigripinnis (Alcock, 1889) (Eleven specimens from off Natal; several localities in Indian Ocean)
Black-edged cuskeel Neobythites analis Barnard, 1927 (Algoa Bay to Natal coast)
Ophidion smithi (Fowler, 1934) (Red Sea to Natal)
Penopus micropthalmus (Vaillant, 1888) (one specimen off the Cape)
Porogadus miles Goode and bean, 1886 (One specimen off the Cape; relatively common both sides of the Atlantic; also recorded from Indian Ocean)
Selachophidium guentheri Gilchrist, 1903 (Angola to Mozambique)
Spectrunculus grandis (Günther, 1877) (a few specimens off west coast of South Africa; also known from Japan)

Family: Parabrotulidae — False brotulas
Parabrotula plagiopthalma Zugmayer, 1811 (off East London; Both sides North Atlantic)

Superorder Polymixiomorpha

Order Polymixiiformes
Family: Polymixiidae — Beardfishes
Pacific beardfish Polymixia berndti Gilbert, 1905 (Off Natal, Kenya, Philippines, Japan and Hawaii)

Superorder Protacanthopterygii

Order Argentiniformes
Suborder: Alepocephaloidei

Family: Alepocephalidae — Slickheads
Alepocephalus australis Barnard 1923 (Off Cape Point; apparently widely distributed in temperate waters of southern hemisphere)
Rouleina maderensis Maul, 1948 (3 specimens from off South Africa)
Talismania kotlyari Sazonov & Ivanov, 1980 (One specimen from 24°55'S, 35°40'E)
Xenodermichthys copei (Gill, 1884) (common off South Africa)
Family: Leptochilichthyidae
Leptochilichthys pinguis (Vaillant, 1886) (one specimen from off South Africa 36°40'S, 20°10E)

Suborder: Argentinoidei

Family: Argentinidae — Argentines
Argentina euchus Cohen, 1961 (Natal to Kenya)

Family: Opisthoproctidae — Barreleyes
Rhynchohyalus natalensis (Gilchrist and von Bonde, 1924) (off Cape Town to Bermuda)

Family: Microstomatidae
Nansenia macrolepis (Gilchrist, 1922) (off Natal; West of Cape Peninsula)
Subfamily: Bathylaginae — Deep sea smelts
Bathylagus bericoides (Borodin, 1929) (off Cape Town; Throughout tropical and subtropical seas)

Superorder Scopelomorpha — Lanternfishes

Order Myctophiformes
Family: Myctophidae — Lanternfishes
Benthosema fibulatum (Gilbert and Cramer, 1897) (Indian Ocean (18°N - 20°S), to 42°S in Agulhas current)
Benthosema suborbitale (Gilbert, 1913) (tropical distribution in 3 major oceans, extensions to 50°S and 50°N in western boundary currents)
Bolinichthys indicus (Nafpaktitis and Nafpaktitis, 1969) (Indian Ocean (20° - 45°S); Atlantic (20° - 50°N and 20° - 40°S))
Bolinichthys supralateralis (Parr, 1928) (off Cape Peninsula and in Agulgas current; Atlantic (40°N - 02°S and 32° to 40°S); Indian Ocean (21° - 30°S); west coast of Australia and near Hawaii)
Centrobranchus nigroocellatus (Günther, 1873) (Atlantic (40°N - 36°S); Indian Ocean (08° - 34°S) and off Chile and New Zealand)
Ceratoscopelus warmingii (Lütken, 1892) (Atlantic(42°N - 40°S); Indian Ocean (20°N - 45°S);tropical/subtropical Pacific)
Diaphus brachycephalus Tåning, 1928 (In Agulhas current and off west coast in Agulhas water pockets; broadly tropical in Atlantic and Indo-Pacific)
Diaphus diadematus Tåning, 1928 (in Agulhas current and off west coast in Agulhas water pockets and warmed upwelled central water northwards to 18°S; Indian Ocean (02°N - 38°S, and in Mozambique channel, but absent in central sector)
Diaphus dumerilii (Bleeker, 1856) (off west coast as pseudoceanic pelagic species southward to 23°S)
Diaphus effulgens (Goode and Bean, 1896) (off all SA coasts)
Diaphus garmani (Gilbert, 1906)(east coast continental shelf/slope southwards to about 26°S)
Diaphus hudsoni (Zubrigg and Scott, 1976) (From 18°S off west coast to 27°S off east coast)
Diaphus jenseni Tåning, 1932 (one record at 33°49'S, 27°48'E; Indo-Pacific)
Diaphus lucidus (Goode and Bean, 1896) (In Agulhas current and off west coast in Agulhas water pockets. Atlantic(40°N - 38°S, but absent in Benguela upwelling region); also Indo-Pacific)
Diaphus luetkeni (Brauer, 1904) (In Agulhas current to 37°S. Atlantic (42°N - 11°S) also Indo-Pacific)
Diaphus meadi Nafpaktitis, 1978 (In upwelled waters off west coast northwards to at least 21°S. Circumglobal convergence species (32° - 41°S))
Diaphus metopoclampus Cocco, 1829 South of 29°S off west coast and 27°S off east coast. Mediterranean, Atlantic, Indo-West Pacific)
Diaphus mollis Tåning, 1928 (off all SA coasts, Broadly tropical distribution in all major oceans)
Diaphus nielseni Nafpaktitis, 1978 (taken once from Agulhas current (30°17'S, 31°25'E); off east coast of Madagascar, in Mozambique channel, and from southeast Asian seas to southern Japan)
Diaphus ostenfeldi Tåning, 1932 (off west coast northwards to about 23°S; Circumglobal convergence species (35° - 45°S))
Diaphus parri Tåning, 1932 (in Agulhas current and off west coast in Agulhas water pockets, Indian Ocean (10°N - 12°S with extension to 25°S in Mozambique channel), southeast Asian seas and Pacific (tropical waters west of 95°W))
Diaphus perspicillatus (Ogilby,1898) (In Agulhas current and off west coast in Agulhas water pockets. Broadly tropical species in Atlantic (45°N - 36°S, but absent in southeastern sector); Indo-Pacific)
Diaphus problematicus Parr, 1928 (In Agulhas current and off west coast in Agulhas water pockets. Atlantic(40°N - 39°S but absent south of 13°S in eastern sector); tropical Indo-Pacific with extensions into higher latitudes in western boundary currents)
Diaphus richardsoni Tåning, 1932 (Agulhas current and off west coast in Agulhas water pockets)
Diaphus splendidus (Brauer, 1904) (in Agulhas current southward to 31°S; Atlantic (40°N to 28°S, but absent south of 10°S in eastern sector); Indo-Pacific)
Diaphus taaningi Norman, 1930 (over west coast continental shelf/slope southward to 24°S. Amphitropical species in Atlantic(western sector; tropical waters to 42°N; eastern sector: southward from Mauretanian upwelling region to South African region)
Diaphus watasei Jordan and Starks, 1904 (Over east coast continental shelf/slope southwards to about 30°S)
Diogenichthys atlanticus (Tåning, 1928) (Atlantic (50°N - 48°S), Indian Ocean (22° - 45°S) and Pacific (35°N - 35°S, but absent in equatorial waters west of 130°W and near Hawaii)
Diogenichthys panurgus Bolin, 1946 (In Agulhas current to about 38°S and in Indian Ocean (19°N - 05°S))
Electrona risso (Cocco, 1829) (off east and west coasts of South Africa. Widespread in Atlantic (55°N - 40°S), Mediterranean, Indian Ocean (0° - 40°S), Tasman sea and Cook Strait, and eastern Pacific (42°N - 20°S))
Gonichthys barnesi Whitley, 1943 (Off east and west coasts, south of 30°S. Convergence species in all 3 oceans (30° - 40°S))
Gymnoscopelus braueri (Lönnberg, 1905) (Circumglobal between Subtropical convergence and Antarctica)
Gymnoscopelus piabilis (Whitley, 1931) (off west coast in Benguela upwelling region)
Hygophum hanseni (Tåning, 1932) (From 30°S on west coast to 33°S on east coast. Convergence species (30° to 43°S) in all 3 oceans)
Hygophum hygomii (Lütken, 1892) (West of Cape Peninsula and off east coast (25° - 37°S))
Hygophum proximum Bekker, 1965) (South to about 37°S in Agulhas current; Indian Ocean (25°N - 10°S))
Lampadena luminosa (Garman, 1899) (In Agulhas current. In all 3 oceans (20°N - 20°S) with extensions into higher latitudes in western boundary currents)
Lampadena notialis Nafpaktitis and Paxton, 1968 (Off east coast and cape peninsula; convergence species in all 3 oceans)
Lampadena speculigera Goode and Bean, 1896 (Off west and southeast coasts. Atlantic (66° - 35°N and 35° - 45°S), Indian Ocean (30° to 45°S) and Pacific Ocean (30° - 45°S))
Onderbaadjie Lampanyctodes hectoris (Common in Benguela uprising region)
Lampanyctus achirus Andriashev, 1962 (Southern Benguela upwelling region, off south and east coasts, north to about 31°S)
Lampanyctus alatus Goode and Bean, 1896 (Off all South African coasts; Atlantic (46°N - 38°S), Indian Ocean (0° - 39°S)
Lampanyctus ater Tåning, 1928 (Off all South African coasts; Atlantic (58° - 17°N and 15° - 40°S) and Indian Ocean (12° - 44°S))
Lampanyctus australis Tåning, 1932 (Off all South African coasts; Circumglobal convergence species(33° - 43°S with northern extension to about 27°S in eastern boundary currents))
Lampanyctus festivus Tåning, 1928 (off all South African coasts. Atlantic(53° - 18°N and 28° - 40°S with northern extension to 12°S in Benguela current and Indo-West Pacific.)
Lampanyctus intricarius Tåning, 1928 (In southern Benguela upwelling region. Atlantic (65° - 32°N and region of subtropical convergence) and Indo-Pacific (region of subtropical convergence, with northern extension to 18°S in eastern boundary currents)
Lampanyctus lepidolychnus Bekker, 1967 (off all South African coasts, circumglobal convergence species (23° - 48°S))
Lampanyctus lineatus Tåning, 1928 (Taken once at 34°12'S, 16°35'E)
Lampanyctus macdonaldi (Goode and Bean, 1896) (West of Cape Peninsula, Circumglobal between subtropical convergence and Antarctic polar front)
Lampanyctus nobilis Tåning, 1928 (In agulhas current and off west coast in Agulhas water pockets. Atlantic (40°N - 21°S), Indo-Pacific)
Lampanyctus pusillus (Johnson, 1890) (Off all South African coasts. Bisubtropical species in all major oceans)
Lampanyctus turneri (Fowler, 1934) (In Agulhas current and off west coast in Agulhas water pockets. Tropical and subtropical waters between south China sea and western Indian Ocean)
Lampichthys procerus (Brauer, 1904) (Off Cape Peninsula, circumglobal convergence species (32° - 48°S) with extensions into lower latitudes in eastern boundary currents)
Lobianchia dofleini (Zugmayer, 1911) (Off all South African coasts. Mediterranean, Atlantic (50°N - 40°S), Indian Ocean (23° - 38°S), Tasman sea and south Pacific(region of subtropical convergence))
Lobianchia gemellarii (Cocco, 1838) (off all South African coasts. Worldwide in tropical/subtropical waters.)
Metelectrona ventralis (Bekker, 1063) (West of Cape Peninsula in Southern Benguela upwelling region; Curcumglobal subantarctic species (36°-51°S))
Myctophum asperum Richardson, 1845 (off east coast and in Agulhas water pockets off west coast.)
Myctophum aurolaternatum Garman, 1899 (in Agulhas current south to about 31°S)
Myctophum nitidulum Garman, 1809 (In Agulhas current and off west coast in Agulhas water pockets)
Myctophum obtusirostre Tåning, 1928 (In Agulhas current and off west coast in pockets of Agulhas water)
Myctophum phengodes (Lütken, 1892) (Off all South African coasts)
Myctophum selenops Tåning, 1928 (West of Cape Peninsula in Agulhas water pockets)
Myctophum spinosum (Steindachner, 1867) (In Agulhas current and off west coast in Agulhas water pockets)
Notolychnus valdiviae (Brauer, 1904) (off all South African coasts)
Notoscopelus caudispinosus (Johnson, 1863) (in Agulhas current south to 34°S. Broadly tropical in Atlantic (42°N - 37°S) and Indian oceans)
Notoscopelus resplendens (Richardson, 1845) (off all South African coasts)
Protomyctophum subparallelum Tåning, 1932 (off west coast at Vema seamount, Circumglobal in region of subtropical convergence with northern extension to 30°S in eastern boundary currents)
Protomyctophum normani Tåning, 1932 (once west of Slangkop lighthouse; Circumglobal convergence species (36° - 43°S))
Scopelopsis multipunctatus Brauer, 1906 (off all South African coasts)
Symbolophorus barnardi (Tåning, 1932) (occurs off all South African coasts)
Symbolophorus boops (Richardson, 1845) (Southern Benguela upwelling region north to 25°S; circumglobal in and south of subtropical convergence)
Symbolophorus evermanni (Gilbert, 1905) (Agilhas current south to about 33°S; tropical Indo-Pacific)
Taaningichthys bathyphilus (Tåning, 1928) (off east coast (30° - 33°S); widespread in all three oceans)
Taaningichthys minimus (Tåning, 1928) (taken at 34°15'S, 16°00'E; Atlantic (40° - 20°N and 08° - 38°S), Indian Ocean (20° - 30°S); central and eastern North Pacific)
Triphoturus nigrescens (Brauer, 1904) (In Agulhas current south to about 40°S; Indian Ocean (08°N - 15°S) and Pacific Ocean (30°N - 30°S))

Family: Neoscopelidae — Blackchins
Neoscopelus macrolepidotus Johnson, 1863 (off Natal between 27° and 30°S)
Neoscopelus microchir Matsubara, 1943 (one record off Natal (27°45'S, 32°44'E), both sides of the Atlantic and western Pacific)
Scopelengys tristis Alcock, 1890 (one record at 33°25'S, 27°54'E; also all 3 major oceans)

Superorder Stenopterygii

Order Ateleopodiformes
Family: Ateleopodidae — Tadpole fishes
Ateleopus natalensis Regan, 1921 (Cape to Red sea)
Guentherus altivela Osorio, 1917 (West coast of Africa from Cabo Blanco to the Cape)
Ijimaia loppei Roule, 1922 (Morocco to Cape Peninsula)

Order Stomiiformes
Suborder: Gonostomatoidei

Family: Gonostomatidae — Bristlemouths
Cyclothone acclinidens Garman, 1899 (off Cape Point; tropical/subtropical in all three major oceans)
Cyclothone alba Brauer, 1906 (off Saldanha; all three major oceans)
Cyclothone microdon (Günther, 1878) (inshore from Saldanha to Mossel Bay; All 3 major oceans)
Cyclothone pallida Brauer, 1902 (all three major oceans)
Cyclothone pseudopallida Mukhacheva, 1964 (Off Cape Agulhas; all three major oceans)
Diplophos rebainsi Krefft and Parin, 1972 (off south western Cape coast; Southern Atlantic and south-eastern Pacific Oceans)
Diplophos teania Günther, 1873 (all three major oceans; all around SA coast)
Gonostoma atlanticum Norman, 1930 ( 25°26'S, 38°11'E and 39°01'S, 20°04'E; tropical/subtropical all oceans)
Gonostoma bathyphilum (Vaillant, 1886) (off Cape Point; temperate/subtropical Atlantic and Pacific oceans)
Gonostoma denudatum Rafinesque, 1810 (Temperate/subtropical Atlantic; off Southern Africa to ca. 37°S)
Gonostoma elongatum Günther, 1878 (off Saldanha; all three major oceans)
Margrethia obtusirostra Jespersen & Tåning, 1919 (off Cape Agulhas and 25°26'S, 38°11'E; all three major oceans)
Margrethia valentinae Parin, 1982 (off South Africa (c. 37°S, 20°;E -20°W; probably part of Circumglobal Subtropical Convergence fauna)

Family: Phosichthyidae — Lightfishes
Ichthyococcus australis Mukhacheva, 1980 (Circumglobal in subtropical convergence region of southern hemisphere with records between 30° and 40°S in Atlantic sector of our region)
Phosichthys argenteus Hutton, 1873 (South-east Atlantic, south-east of Cape Agulhas and off Natal coast)
Polymetme corythaeola (Alcock, 1898) (off Natal; all three major oceans)
Vinciguerria attenuata (Cocco, 1838) (off Cape Point; all three major oceans)
Vinciguerria nimbaria (Jordan and Williams, 1896) (tropical/subtropical waters in all three major oceans; East London to Delagoa Bay)

Family: Sternoptychidae — Hatchetfishes

Subfamily: Maurolicinae
Maurolicus muelleri (Gmelin, 1788) (all oceans, more common in colder regions)
Valenciennellus tripunctatus (Esmark, 1871) (all oceans, tropical, subtropical and temperate waters)

Subfamily: Sternoptychinae
Argyropelecus aculeatus Valenciennes, 1849 (worldwide in tropical and temperate seas)
Argyropelecus gigas Norman, 1930 (Southeast of Cape of Good Hope; Indian Ocean to 40°S and south Atlantic to 38°S)
Argyropelecus hemigymnus Cocco, 1829 (worldwide distribution, common on SA waters to 35°S)
Polyipnus indicus Schultz, 1961 (east coast from 30°S to 5°N)
Sternoptyx diaphana Hermann, 1981 (worldwide in tropical and temperate seas)
Sternoptyx pseudodiaphana Borodulina, 1977 (Indian Ocean south of 35°S; circumglobal in Southern Ocean; Benguela current)

Family: Stomiidae

Subfamily: Astronesthinae — Snaggletooths
Astronesthes boulangeri Gilchrist, 1902 (southeast of Cape Point, Circumpolar between 30° and 40°S)
Astronesthes indicus Brauer, 1902 (Circumglobal in tropical waters, Taken between 33° and 35°S on Atlantic side)
Astronesthes martensii Klunzinger, 1871 (Indonesia to Red Sea and south to Durban)
Borostomias mononema (Regan and Trewavas, 1929) (mainly in tropical waters of Atlantic and Indian oceans, Reported from Atlantic side at about 28°S and from Indian Ocean to about 25°S)
Neonesthes capensis (Gilchrist and von Bonde, 1924) (off South Africa, Subtropical/temperate waters of all oceans)

Subfamily: Idiacanthinae — Sawtail-fishes
Idiacanthus atlanticus Brauer, 1906 (Circumglobal between about 26°S and Subtropical convergence
Ideacanthus fasciola Peters, 1877 (off east coast and in Agulhas water pockets in eastern south Atlantic. 24°-26°S)

Subfamily: Malacosteinae — Loosejaws
Aristostomias polydactylus Regan and Trewavas, 1930 (Taken once on Atlantic side, once on Indian Ocean side of the area, occurs in all three major oceans)
Malacosteus niger Ayres, 1848 (Tropical and subtropical in all three major oceans)

Subfamily: Melanostomiinae — Scaleless dragonfishes
Bathophilus digitatus (Welsh, 1923) (single specimen from off Cape Town; North Atlantic, Indian and pacific oceans)
Bathophilus longipinnus (Pappenheim, 1914) (off Cape Town; occurs widely in all three major oceans)
Bathophilus nigerrimus Giglioli, 1884 (Off Cape Town and off Port Elizabeth to Mozambique channel)
Echiostoma barbatum Lowe, 1843 (Southeast of Algoa Bay and off Cape Town; widespread in tropical/subtropical waters of all oceans)
Eustomias bulbornatus Gibbs, 1960 (south and west of Cape of Good Hope; Tropical Indian and Pacific oceans)
Eustomias filifer (Gilchrist, 1906) (off Cape Point; tropical and subtropical Atlantic)
Eustomias grandibulbus Gibbs, Clarke and Gomon, 1983 (off Cape Town)
Eustomias lipochirus Regan and Trewavas, 1930 (2 specimens from south west of Cape of Good Hope; Tropical/subtropical Atlantic)
Eustomias schmidti Regan and Trewavas, 1930 (off Cape Town; occurs widely in all three major oceans)
Eustomias trewavasae Norman, 1930 (circumglobal between about 33° and 40°S)
Leptostomias gladiator (Zugmayer, 1911) (Tropical, subtropical and temperate Atlantic, also Indian and Pacific oceans)
Melanostomias bartonbeani Parr, 1927 (once off Cape Columbine; widespread in Atlantic and southern Indian oceans)
Melanostomias niger Gilchrist and von Bonde, 1924 (widespread in Atlantic between 20° and 50°S)
Melanostomias valdiviae Brauer, 1902 (off Cape Town and northeast of Durban; all three major oceans)
Opostomias micripnis (Günther, 1878) (northwest of Cape Town; occurs across the Atlantic, Pacific and possibly Indian Ocean south of about 33°S) (syn. Opostomias gibsonpacei Barnard, 1948)
Pachystomias microdon (Günther, 1878) (off Western Cape coast; widespread in all three major oceans)(Günther, 1878)
Photonectes braueri (Zugmayer, 1913) (off Cape Town; Atlantic and western Indian Ocean)
Photonectes parvimanus Regan and Trewavas, 1930 (off west coast; north Atlantic and central Pacific)
Trigonolampa miriceps Regan and Trewavas, 1930 (off west coast; apparently circumglobal in Southern Ocean south of 30°S)

Subfamily: Stomiinae — Scaly dragonfishes
Macrostomias longibarbatus Brauer, 1902 (Taken once off Cape of Good Hope, Widespread in subtropical and tropical Atlantic and tropical Indian and Pacific oceans)
Stomias boa boa (Risso, 1810) (Taken offshore throughout the area)
Chauliodus sloani Schneider, 1801 (Taken offshore throughout the area)

Class Sarcopterygii — Lobefin fishes

Subclass Actinistia

Order Coelacanthiformes — Coelacanths

Family: Latimeriidae
Coelacanth Latimeria chalumnae Smith, 1939 (northern KwaZulu-Natal)

References

'
South Africa
Fish, Marine bony fish
'bony
Marine biodiversity of South Africa